Deadly may refer to:

 Deadliness, the ability to cause death

Arts and entertainment
 Deadly, a 2011 novel by Julie Chibbaro
 Deadly, a children's book series by Morris Gleitzman and Paul Jennings
 Deadly (Australian TV series), an Australian children's television cartoon series
 Deadly (film), a 1991 Australian film
 Deadly (franchise), a British wildlife TV documentary series
 Deadly Awards, also known as The Deadlys, awards for excellence given to Indigenous Australians for achievement in music, sport, entertainment and community
 Karla (film), a 2006 American movie originally titled Deadly

Other uses
 Alan Dedicoat (born 1954), BBC announcer nicknamed "Deadly"
Deadly, a word in Aboriginal Australian English meaning excellent, similar to "wicked" or "awesome" in English slang

See also 
 Lethal (disambiguation)
Deadly Nannas, Australian singing group
Uncle Deadly (Muppet), a Muppets character
 "Too Deadly", an episode of Wapos Bay